Iowa Highway 2 (Iowa 2) is a  state highway which runs across the southernmost tier of counties in the U.S. state of Iowa. Iowa 2 stretches across the entire state; from the Missouri River near Nebraska City, Nebraska, to U.S. Highway 61 (US 61) at Fort Madison. Prior to becoming a primary highway, the route was known as the Waubonsie Trail.

Route description

Iowa Highway 2 begins at the Nebraska City Bridge just east of Nebraska City, Nebraska.  It goes northeast and then east as an expressway until meeting Interstate 29.  It then continues east as a two-lane highway until meeting U.S. Highway 275 and turning north.  It continues north, bypassing Sidney with U.S. 275, and turning east of Sidney.  It goes east and meets U.S. 59 at Shenandoah and then U.S. 71 at Clarinda, which is served with Business Route 2.  It continues east through New Market and meets Iowa Highway 148 at Bedford.  After intersecting Iowa Highway 25 east of Bedford, it passes through Benton before beginning an overlap with U.S. Highway 169 through Mount Ayr.  After passing through Kellerton, Iowa 2 intersects Interstate 35 at Decatur City.

Iowa Highway 2 continues east through Decatur City and meets U.S. Highway 69 in Leon.  It continues east and intersects U.S. Highway 65 before entering Corydon, where it intersects Iowa Highway 14.  After passing through Promise City, it goes through Centerville, where it intersects Iowa Highway 5.  It later intersects Iowa Highway 202 near Moulton and then begins a concurrency with U.S. Highway 63 which ends in Bloomfield.

After Bloomfield, Iowa Highway 2 turns southeasterly to pass through Pulaski, Milton, and Cantril, then turns briefly northeast.  It turns east, intersects Iowa Highway 1 south of Keosauqua, then turns southeast towards Farmington.  At Farmington, Iowa 2 meets Iowa Highway 81 and crosses the Des Moines River.  It continues east and meets U.S. Highway 218 and Iowa Highway 27 at Donnellson.  From there, it then meets U.S. Highway 61 and ends on the west side of Fort Madison.

Clarinda business loop

Iowa Highway 2 Business begins at the western edge of Clarinda on an old alignment of Iowa 2.  It follows State Street east into Clarinda.  At 16th Street (Glenn Miller Avenue), IA 2 Bus. heads south until its junction with US 71 Business.  Both routes follow Washington Street east towards US 71.  Iowa 2 Business follows US 71 south to IA 2 to complete the business loop.

History
The current Iowa Highway 2 was designated in 1920 as Primary Road No. 3 (PR No. 3).  The  route connected Nebraska City, Nebraska, to Burlington.  PR No. 3 was overlaid upon the Waubonsie Trail from the Missouri River to Fort Madison.  From Fort Madison, it overlapped the Mississippi Valley Scenic Highway, a precursor to the Great River Road.  In 1941, the route had been renumbered Iowa 2 and the section between Fort Madison and Burlington was no longer part of the route.

The segment west of Interstate 29 was constructed as an expressway in 1986 with the plan of connecting Lincoln, Nebraska with Interstate 29 using a divided highway.

In late 2013, the Fort Madison city council accepted the jurisdiction of Iowa 2 within the city limits, which eliminated the last  from the route.

Major intersections

References

External links

The Iowa Highways Page by Jason Hancock

002
Transportation in Decatur County, Iowa